Tantash is a  mountain in the Cordillera Blanca in the Andes of Peru. It is situated in the Ancash Region, Recuay Province, Catac District. Tantash lies southeast of Mururaju and east of Pukarahu.

Sources

Mountains of Peru
Mountains of Ancash Region